Wat Chiang Yuen is a Buddhist temple in Chiang Mai, Thailand, located north of the Old City, about  east of Wat Lok Moli. First built in 1500s, Lanna kings historically paid homage to the Phra Suppunyu Chao Buddha image at the temple before their coronation. The temple was abandoned during Burmese rule, and was reconstructed in 1794 by King Kawila. The temple is known for its large chedi, which has a whitewashed square base guarded by Burmese chinthe on each corner, an octagonal middle section dotted with porcelain flowers, and a five-tiered hti crowning the stupa. The Lanna-style sala is buttressed by two elaborately decorated poles called tagundaing, each topped by a hamsa.

References

External links

Chiang Yuen